Weightlifting at the 2010 Asian Games was held in Guangzhou, China from November 13 to 19, 2010. There are seven weight categories for the women and eight for the men. All competition took place at the Dongguan Arena.

Schedule

Medalists

Men

Women

Medal table

Participating nations
A total of 176 athletes from 31 nations competed in weightlifting at the 2010 Asian Games:

References
Results at iwf.net

External links
Weightlifting Site of 2010 Asian Games 

 
2010
2010
2010 Asian Games events
2010 in weightlifting
International weightlifting competitions hosted by China